Lusakert is a village in Artik Municipality of the Shirak Province in Armenia.

Demographics

References

External Links 

Populated places in Shirak Province